Wentworth M. Johnson (born 1939) is a Canadian writer. He was born in March, Cambridgeshire, England. W.M. Johnson is the great grandson of William Edward Bourne 1850-1925 (Playwright, dramatist and theatrical producer).
 Johnson has published newspaper and magazine articles, fiction and non-fiction books.

Non-Series fiction books
The Angel of the Vail (First Edition 1996, Second Edition 2021)
Matthew 5 (2002 renamed The curse of Valdi in 2009)
The Curse of Valdi (2009, Second Edition 2013)
Happisburgh High-jinks (2013)
Sideways Time:How I Discovered the Universe (2013)
The Beast of St John's Cove (2013)
The Dragon of Hope Island (2013)

Non-fiction books
Signpost: The Guide to British Pubs (1990)
Blood In The Streets Murders In The City Of Hamilton (2013)

Plays
Victoriana - three plays from 1890s - Work and Wages - A Big Fortune - A London Mystery (Wentworth M Johnson, Pieter F. de Lang 2013)

Series books

Daughters of the Sun Chronicles
 Earthly Menace (2004)
 Arlon (2004)
 Virus (2004)
 Hypostasis Team (2004)
 Final Solution (2004)

Bill Reyner Mystery Adventure Series
 Fiend's Gold (First Edition 2001, Second Edition 2009, Third Edition 2013, Updated 2021)
 Mania (First Edition 2002, Second Edition 2009, Third Edition 2013, Updated 2021)
 Edinburgh Cuckoos (First Edition 2002, Second Edition 2009, Third Edition 2013, Updated 2022)
 Damp Graves (First Edition 2002, Second Edition 2010, Third Edition 2013, Updated 2022)
 Lions and Christians (First Edition 2002, Second Edition 2010, Third Edition 2013)
 The Canadian (First Edition 2010, Second Edition 2013)
 The Dutchman (First Edition 2010, Second Edition 2013)
 The Mermaid (First Edition 2011, Second Edition 2013)
 Magnuscarter (First Edition 24 April 2013, Second Edition 2021)
 The Agency (First Edition 26 February 2014, Updated 2022)

The Adventures of Two Special Animals
 A Dual Tale (First Edition 2013)
 Secret of Castle Duncan (First Edition 2013)
 Trouble at Castle Duncan (First Edition 2013)

References

External links
Wentworth M Johnson's Official Website

1939 births
Living people
Canadian science fiction writers
People from March, Cambridgeshire